Cincinnatus Powell (February 25, 1942 – January 9, 2023) was an American professional basketball player.  A 6'7" (2.01 m) forward from the University of Portland, Powell was selected by the St. Louis Hawks in the eighth round of the 1965 NBA draft.  He did not make the Hawks' roster, but he would soon blossom while playing for the American Basketball Association's Dallas Chaparrals.  Powell averaged 18.3 points and nine rebounds in his first season with the Chaparrals, and two years later he represented Dallas in the ABA All-Star Game.  Powell also spent time with the Kentucky Colonels, Utah Stars, and Virginia Squires, and he ended his ABA career in 1975 with 9,746 total points. Powell is a first cousin of former United States Secretary of State Colin Powell. Powell's son, Cincy, Jr. died in 2004 at age 35, the result of Juvenile Diabetes. Powell is an inductee in the University of Portland Hall of Fame.

Powell died in Dallas, Texas, on January 9, 2023, at the age of 80.

References

External links
Career Stats @ basketball-reference.com

1942 births
2023 deaths
American men's basketball players
Basketball players from Baton Rouge, Louisiana
Dallas Chaparrals players
Kentucky Colonels players
Portland Pilots men's basketball players
Power forwards (basketball)
Small forwards
St. Louis Hawks draft picks
Utah Stars players
Virginia Squires players